Salt Lick/God's Balls is a CD / cassette-only compilation by the American grunge band TAD. It consists of:
the EP Salt Lick;
the A-side of the SP55 7‘’ ("Loser" b/w "Cooking with Gas");
7 selected tracks (out of 10) from the album God's Balls.

Both records had previously been released in the United States only on vinyl. It is currently out of print.

Track listing

Salt Lick EP

"Axe to Grind" – 2:10
"High on the Hog" – 2:28
"Wood Goblins" – 3:13
"Hibernation" – 2:56
"Glue Machine" – 3:43
"Potlatch" – 3:26

SP55 7‘’

"Loser" – 3:26

Selection from "God's Balls"

"Behemoth" – 4:08
"Pork Chop" – 4:19
"Helot" – 2:54
"Sex God Missy" – 4:26
"Cyanide Bath" – 3:35
"Boiler Room" – 4:47
"Satan's Chainsaw" – 3:10

The 3 tracks from "God's Balls" that didn't make it on this compilation are:
 "Tuna Car"
 "Hollow Man"
 "Nipple Belt"

References

Tad (band) albums
Albums produced by Steve Albini
1990 compilation albums
Grunge compilation albums
Sub Pop compilation albums
Albums produced by Jack Endino